The following is a list of events relating to television in Ireland from 1964.

Events

3 January – Tolka Row, an urban drama serial by Maura Laverty first goes on air.
January – Reverend Fergus Day, of the Church of Ireland is appointed to advise on the broadcasting of Protestant religious programmes.
4 February –  Telefís Scoile, one of the earliest teaching programmes for schools on television in Europe is first aired by Telefís Éireann.
March – Patrick Jennings appointed RTÉ's Agricultural Advisor.
20 April – The BBC Two Northern Ireland service goes on air.
14 September – Newsbeat, a topical and often humorous programme, first goes on air. It features reporters Frank Tuomey and Frank Hall with caption stories by cartoonist Terry Williers.

Debuts
3 January – Tolka Row (1964–1968)
7 January – Discovery (1964)
14 September – Newsbeat (1964–1971)

Ongoing television programmes
RTÉ News: Nine O'Clock (1961–present)
Jackpot (1962–1965)
Dáithí Lacha (1962–1969)
RTÉ News: Six One (1962–present)
The Late Late Show (1962–present)

Births
10 May – Diarmuid Gavin, garden designer and television personality
25 September – Maria Doyle Kennedy, actress and singer

See also
1964 in Ireland

References

 
1960s in Irish television